The Apostolic Nunciature to Indonesia, unofficially known as the Vatican Embassy in Jakarta is a diplomatic position within the Vatican, equivalent to an embassy. It is located at Jalan Merdeka Timur 18 in Central Jakarta. 

The Apostolic Nuncio of the Holy See to the Republic of Indonesia serves both as the ambassador of the Pope (as head of State of Vatican City) to the President of Indonesia, and as delegate and point-of-contact between the Catholic hierarchy in Indonesia and the Pope (as head of the church).

List of papal representatives
Apostolic Delegates
 Georges-Marie de Jonghe d'Ardoye (6 July 1947 – 2 March 1955)
Apostolic Internuncios
 Domenico Enrici (17 September 1955 – 30 January 1958)
 Ottavio De Liva (18 April 1962 – 23 August 1965)
Apostolic Pro-Nuncio
 Salvatore Pappalardo (7 December 1965 – 7 May 1969)
Apostolic Nuncios
 Joseph Mees (14 June 1969 - 10 July 1973)
 Vincenzo Maria Farano (8 August 1973 – 25 August 1979)
 Pablo Puente Buces (18 March 1980 – 15 March 1986)
 Francesco Canalini (28 May 1986 – 20 July 1991)
 Pietro Sambi (28 November 1991 – 6 June 1998) 
 Renzo Fratini (8 August 1998 – 27 January 2004)
 Malcolm Ranjith (29 April 2004 – 10 December 2005) 
 Leopoldo Girelli (13 April 2006 – 13 January 2011) 
 Antonio Guido Filipazzi (23 March 2011–26 April 2017)
 Piero Pioppo (8 September 2017 – present)

See also
 Holy See–Indonesia relations
 Catholic Church in Indonesia

References

External links
 

Indonesia
Diplomatic missions in Jakarta